Gavriil Dmitriyevich Kachalin (17 January 1911 – 23 May 1995) was a Soviet and Russian football player and coach. 

He led the USSR national football team to their greatest achievements, Olympics gold medals in 1956 and European Football Championship title in 1960, and also coached them in three World Cups: 1958, 1962 and 1970. 

With Kachalin, FC Dinamo Tbilisi won the first Soviet Top League title in their history in 1964 and later finished 3rd twice, in 1971 and in 1972. Kachalin became 3rd again in 1973 with FC Dynamo Moscow.

Playing career
Kachalin started his career in 1928 in the club called Volny Trud. Then he played for Gomel city football team and FC Dynamo Gomel. From 1936 to 1942 he competed for FC Dynamo Moscow. During his career he played in 36 Soviet Top League matches, and became a twice champion in 1937 and 1940 and a Soviet Cup winner in 1937 with Dynamo Moscow. He also played against Basque Country national football team.

Coaching career
Gavriil Kachalin was a head coach of following club and national teams:
FC Trudovye Rezervy Moscow (1945–1948)
FC Lokomotiv Moscow (1949–1952)
USSR national football team as a head coach assistant (1954)
USSR national football team (1955–1958, 1960–1962, 1968–1970)
Pakhtakor Tashkent FK (1963, 1975)
FC Dinamo Tbilisi (1964–1965, 1971–1972)
USSR national under-21 football team (1965)
USSR national olympics football team (1966–1968)
FC Dynamo Moscow (1973–1974)

At the end of his career, Kachalin worked in Dynamo Moscow youth academy. He was a chairman of the Board of Coaches of Soviet Football Federation in 1963. Kachalin also was a member of FIFA technical committee.

Achievements

As player 
Dynamo Moscow
Soviet Top League (2): 1937, 1940
Soviet Cup (1): 1937

As manager 
Dinamo Tbilisi
Soviet Top League (1): 1964; Bronze Medal (2): 1971, 1972

Dynamo Moscow
Soviet Top League Bronze Medal (1): 1973

Soviet Union
UEFA European Championship (1): 1960
Summer Olympic Games (1): 1956

Moscow XI
Spartakiad of the Peoples of the USSR (1): 1956

Awards
Honored Master of Sports of the USSR
Merited Coach of the USSR
Order of Friendship of Peoples
Order of the Red Banner of Labour

References

1911 births
1995 deaths
Footballers from Moscow
Honoured Masters of Sport of the USSR
Merited Coaches of the Soviet Union
Recipients of the Order of Friendship of Peoples
Recipients of the Order of the Red Banner of Labour
Russian footballers
Soviet footballers
Soviet Top League players
FC Dynamo Moscow players
Soviet football managers
Soviet Union national football team managers
1958 FIFA World Cup managers
1962 FIFA World Cup managers
1970 FIFA World Cup managers
1960 European Nations' Cup managers
UEFA European Championship-winning managers
FC Lokomotiv Moscow managers
FC Dynamo Moscow managers
Pakhtakor Tashkent FK managers
FC Dinamo Tbilisi managers
Association football midfielders